Allan Hugues Zebie (born May 29, 1993) is a soccer coach and former player. Born in France, Zebie was called up to Canadian youth teams as a player.

Early life
Zebie was born in Paris, France to parents of Ivorian descent and moved to Lachine, Quebec at age nine, later moving to Brossard, Quebec. He began playing soccer at age six in Paris, and began playing soccer in Canada with Lachine SC. His family then moved to Edmonton when he was 15. He later joined the FC Edmonton Academy. He then headed to Europe, where he trialed with English club Leeds United and Scottish club Rangers.

Club career
In 2014, he returned to FC Edmonton, where he trained with the first team for the second half of the season. In January 2015, he signed a professional contract with FC Edmonton to play in theNorth American Soccer League. He made his debut for Edmonton on May 3 against Minnesota United FC as a substitute for Albert Watson in a 2–2 draw. Zebie would spend three seasons with FC Edmonton, before the club ceased operations after the 2017 season.

Zebie was announced as part of the roster of the re-launched FC Edmonton in the new Canadian Premier League on November 29, 2018. On November 27, 2019, Zebie re-signed with Edmonton for the 2020 season. He once again re-signed for the 2021 season. On November 14, 2021, he announced his retirement from the sport.

International career
Zebie was a member of the Canada U-20 team that participated at the 2013 CONCACAF U-20 Championship. He was an unused substitute in all of Canada's games at the tournament.

Coaching career
On April 7, 2022, Zebie was named as an assistant coach at FC Edmonton under Alan Koch.

Personal life
His younger brother Bruno was also a soccer player.

Career statistics

References

External links

1993 births
Living people
Association football defenders
Canadian soccer players
French footballers
Footballers from Paris
People from Lachine, Quebec
People from Brossard
Soccer players from Montreal
Soccer players from Edmonton
Canadian people of Ivorian descent
French sportspeople of Ivorian descent
Black Canadian soccer players
Black French sportspeople
French emigrants to Canada
Naturalized citizens of Canada
FC Edmonton players
North American Soccer League players
Canadian Premier League players
Northern Alberta Institute of Technology alumni
University and college soccer players in Canada
Canadian soccer coaches
FC Edmonton coaches